Richard Duke Heinz (born 1967) is a United States Navy rear admiral who serves as the director of logistics of the United States European Command.

Career
Heinz received his commission in 1989 through Officer Candidate School. During those tours, he participated in Operation Desert Fox, Operation Iraqi Freedom, and Operation Enduring Freedom. He's also a member of the Defense Acquisition Professional Community.

Shore assignments include:
Strategy and Readiness Division Chief for the Joint Chiefs of Staff J4
Commander, Naval Supply Systems Command (NAVSUP) Weapon Systems Support (WSS)
Commanding officer, NAVSUP Fleet Logistics Center, Jacksonville
Director, Aviation Operations at NAVSUP WSS, Philadelphia
Head, Program Objective Memorandum Development Section, Office of the Chief of Naval Operations, N80, Washington, D.C.
S-3 Integrated Weapons System Lead, NAVSUP WSS
Officer in Command shore detailer, NAVSUP Office of Personnel, Millington
Supply officer for Navy Flight Demonstration Team Blue Angels and aviation support division officer, at Naval Air Station Lemoore.

Education
B.B.A, International Business from James Madison University
M.B.A, from Embry-Riddle Aeronautical University
M.S. in National Resource Strategy from the Eisenhower School, at National Defense University. 
Graduate of the University of North Carolina’s Executive Development Institute.

Awards
He is also a qualified Naval Aviation Supply officer, Submarine Warfare Supply Corps officer.
Notable Awards include:
   Defense Superior Service Medal
   Legion of Merit 
   Meritorious Service Medal

References

1967 births
Living people
Place of birth missing (living people)
James Madison University alumni
Embry–Riddle Aeronautical University alumni
Dwight D. Eisenhower School for National Security and Resource Strategy alumni
Recipients of the Meritorious Service Medal (United States)
Recipients of the Legion of Merit
United States Navy admirals
Recipients of the Defense Superior Service Medal